The Priests was the eponymous debut album by Catholic group, The Priests. The album was a worldwide commercial success, peaking in the top ten in many countries. It also holds the record for "Fastest-selling UK debut for a classical act".

Track listing

Charts

Weekly charts

Year-end charts

Certifications

References

External links
 The Priests Official Website

2008 debut albums
Epic Records albums
The Priests albums